The Santa Fe Building is one of the oldest buildings in downtown Amarillo, Texas, U.S.A. It was completed on January 18, 1930 and had the regional offices of the Atchison, Topeka and Santa Fe Railway company. The Amarillo office of the railroad company supervised more than 5,800 miles (9,334 km) of railroads. Brennan Construction Company of Amarillo and Dallas built the building from 1928 to 1930 with an original construction cost of US$1.5 million.

The building was vacant more than a decade in the 1990s, until Potter County bought it for $426,000 to gain new office spaces in 1995. It was reopened in 2000, after Potter County spent approximately $14.1 million on renovating the building.

See also

List of tallest buildings in Amarillo
National Register of Historic Places listings in Potter County, Texas
Recorded Texas Historic Landmarks in Potter County

Notes

External links

Santa Fe Building, Amarillo entry on Emporis
Amarillo Globe-News tour of the renovated Santa Fe Building in 2000.

Buildings and structures in Amarillo, Texas
Amarillo
Buildings and structures completed in 1930
Office buildings on the National Register of Historic Places in Texas
Economy of Amarillo, Texas
Skyscrapers in Texas
National Register of Historic Places in Potter County, Texas
Recorded Texas Historic Landmarks
Skyscraper office buildings in Texas
Skyscraper office buildings in Amarillo